United States v England may refer to the following group matches in the 1950, 2010 and 2022 FIFA World Cup:
 United States v England (1950 FIFA World Cup)
 England v United States, Group match in the 2010 FIFA World Cup.
 United States v England, Group match in the 2022 FIFA World Cup.

See also 

 Wars between the United Kingdom and the United States